Arthur Baker (born April 22, 1955) is an American record producer and DJ best known for his work with hip hop artists like Afrika Bambaataa and Planet Patrol, as well as British group New Order. He is also known for remixing the Jill Jones song "Mia Bocca" on the 12" single, taken from her self-titled debut album Jill Jones (1987), released on Prince's Paisley Park Records, as well as remixing the Pet Shop Boys song, "In The Night". His remix of the song was used as the main theme for the BBC TV programme The Clothes Show between 1986 and 1994. He also remixed 'the Massive Jungle Mix' for Tina Turner's UK top 40 lead single from her 1996 album Wildest Dreams "Whatever You Want" (co-written by himself, Taylor Dayne and Fred Zarr).  Arthur Baker's songs are represented by Downtown Music Publishing.

Biography

Early career
Born in Boston, Massachusetts, Baker began working as a club DJ in Boston in the early-1970s, where he was known for playing crowd-pleasing soul and Philly soul. Nonetheless, he had little patience for DJing, saying in an interview: "[If] I didn't get a good reaction on a record, I'd just rip it off, break it up and throw it on the dancefloor."

Baker's production career started off with a few disco recording sessions in Boston. Legendary disco remixer Tom Moulton, who was signed to Casablanca at the time, was required to release an album of his own as part of the deal for working for the label. Tom's brother Jerry came across the sessions written and recorded by Baker, Tony Carbone, and Larry Wedgeworth and bought them in a deal from Baker. Moulton then remixed the tracks and released them as his 1979 album "T.J.M" Baker talked about the album in an interview with Red Bull Music Academy in 2012.

Baker also released a single under the moniker "North End" on West End Records in 1979, "Kind of Life (Kind of Love)."

Remixer/producer
In 1981, Baker moved to New York, where he continued to DJ while pursuing a career as a producer. His first successful single was "Happy Days", which he released under the name North End on Emergency Records in 1981.

In the early 1980s, prior to digital recording equipment that would emerge a decade later, Baker and his contemporaries created remixes on analogue tape. He worked closely with the Latin Rascals, which were influenced by the earlier work of Tom Moulton, John Morales (of Morales and Munzibai), and Walter Gibbons, the creator of the first commercially available twelve-inch single, a remix of Double Exposure's "Ten Percent." The Latin Rascals would eventually edit the work of every major United States dance-music producer active in the 1980s, but in the early days, the duo was part of Baker's circle.

Baker went on to work for hip-hop label Tommy Boy Records, where he produced Afrika Bambaataa and the Soul Sonic Force's "Planet Rock" single, which was a hit in the summer of 1982. The record combined elements from two Kraftwerk recordings, "Trans Europe Express" and "Numbers," which were interpolated by studio musicians, rather than sampled. Later that year, using unused tracks from “Planet Rock, he later produced Planet Patrol's "Play at Your Own Risk" single in 1982, another group with a hit album in 1983.

Also during 1982, he produced the single "Walking on Sunshine" by Rocker's Revenge featuring Donny Calvin which hit number one on the U.S. Dance chart on September 18 that year.

In 1983, Baker found work doing dance remixes of pop and rock hits, first with Cyndi Lauper's "Girls Just Wanna Have Fun," and Bruce Springsteen's "Dancing in the Dark," "Cover Me," and "Born in the U.S.A." from his Born in the U.S.A. album. Also during 1983, Baker produced the track "I.O.U." by Freeez, which was one of the biggest dance hits of the year in the UK. In 1984, Baker contributed his "Breakers' Revenge" to the Beat Street score and movie soundtrack, which he also helped produce. He is the remixer and additional producer for songs for Hall and Oates ("Out Of Touch", "Method Of Modern Love", "Possession Obsession", "Dance On Your Knees") and Diana Ross ("Swept Away", co-written and co-produced by Daryl Hall)). In 1985, he produced three songs on Jennifer Holliday's album Say You Love Me, the biggest hit being "No Frills Love", a song he co-wrote, co-produced, arranged and remixed. The remixes for Pet Shop Boys´ "Suburbia" followed in 1986.

Following these successes, Baker came to the attention of Manchester alternative dance group New Order, who co-wrote "Confusion" and "Thieves Like Us" with him (and Baker can be seen prominently in the music video of the former). The 12-inch single "Confusion" was a crossover hit on the U.S. dance charts, and established a relationship between Baker and the band that has continued since.

Narrowly missing out on signing the Beastie Boys to his Streetwise Records label, Baker did manage to sign the group New Edition, which had success with its single "Candy Girl."

Further collaborations
In 1984, Baker worked with Hall & Oates as mix consultant on their album Big Bam Boom, and the result was a markedly urban and electronic sound for the duo. Baker co-wrote the opening instrumental, "Dance On Your Knees," with Daryl Hall. He also remixed that song and the album's other three chart hits: "Out Of Touch", "Method Of Modern Love", and "Possession Obsession."  Baker also contributed three remixes to “Tease Me,” the lead-off track on (Ohio Players and Parliament Funkadelic alum) Walter “Junie” Morrison's “Evacuate Your Seats” Techno-Freqs EP.

In 1985, Baker helped Bob Dylan complete his Empire Burlesque album as mixer and arranger, and with Little Steven Van Zandt organized and produced the anti-apartheid anthem "Sun City" by Artists United Against Apartheid. He was later honored by the United Nations Special Committee against Apartheid for "high valuable contribution to the international campaign for the elimination of apartheid and the establishment of a non-racial and democratic society in South Africa".

In the late 1980s and later into the 1990s, Baker worked with soul star Al Green, writing and producing the international hit "The Message is Love" and the anti-handgun song "Leave the Guns at Home". In 1989, he released the album Merge on A&M Records as Arthur Baker and the Backbeat Disciples, and remixed Neneh Cherry's  debut single "Buffalo Stance". He was also the music supervisor of the films Fried Green Tomatoes and Listen Up - The Lives of Quincy Jones. In 1991, he released a second album under Arthur Baker and the Backbeat Disciples, Give in to the Rhythm.

1990s–2000s
In the 1990s, following a break from production for some years, Baker moved to London, and established a chain of successful bars—The Elbow Rooms—across the city. He also owns the Tiny Robot restaurant and The Starland Social Club members bar in London, located in Notting Hill. He continues to work as a DJ and producer and recently produced "Part-A" for the genre-busting London Electro Metal band Monsta.

The Arthur Baker remix of 'Spaceman' by Babylon Zoo was used in the 1995 Levi's commercial 'Planet'.

In 2006, the financial services company Visa used a Baker-produced track from Afrika Bambaataa's "Looking For the Perfect Beat" as the backing music of a Visa Check Card commercial. In the ad, an animated worm drawn on the pages of a checkbook does the 1980s dance known as the Worm.

Select discography

Wally Jump Jr. & the Criminal Element

Criminal Element Orchestra

Arthur Baker & the Backbeat Disciples

Other projects

References

External links
Interview on DJ History
The Guardian interview

1955 births
Living people
A&M Records artists
American hip hop musicians
Record producers from Massachusetts
Post-disco musicians
American freestyle musicians
Musicians from Boston
American electro musicians
American DJs
American expatriates in England